The Compositions of Al Cohn is the fourth studio album by jazz musician Miles Davis. It was released in 1953 as a 10 inch LP. It is his third album as leader for Prestige, and fourth altogether, following 1952's Young Man with a Horn for Blue Note. The four tracks were recorded at New York's Beltone Studios on February 19, 1953.

Background
All the tunes were written by tenor saxophonist, composer and arranger Al Cohn. Ira Gitler's liner notes explain the desire to return to arranged music, along the lines of the Birth of the Cool sessions, following three albums focused more on soloing. "[I]t was felt that Miles needed a change of pace for his next recording date; compositions and arrangements which would suit him and result in a happy combination of arranged music and solo work ... Three of the pieces, "Willie The Wailer", "Floppy", and "For Adults Only" were written for this session. "Tasty Pudding" had been written before but Al arranged it specially for Miles and this date." 

In his autobiography, Davis suggests Bob Weinstock had pressured him to record a more disciplined album with more "respectable" musicians, following the debacle of the incomplete session with Charlie Parker attempted earlier that year (released in 1956 on Collectors' Items (PRLP 7044)).

After the 10" LP format was discontinued, the four tracks were all included on the 12" album Miles Davis and Horns (PRLP 7025).

Track listing

Personnel
 Miles Davis – trumpet
 Al Cohn – tenor saxophone
 Zoot Sims – tenor saxophone
 Sonny Truitt – trombone
 John Lewis – piano
 Kenny Clarke – drums
 Leonard Gaskin – double bass

References

1953 albums
Miles Davis albums
Prestige Records albums
Albums produced by Bob Weinstock